Georgia's 12th Senate District elects one member of the Georgia Senate. Its current (2019–20) representative is Democrat Freddie Sims.

References

External links 

Georgia Senate districts